Trouble Man can mean:

 Trouble Man (film), a 1972 blaxploitation film
 Trouble Man (album), the film soundtrack album by Marvin Gaye 
 "Trouble Man" (song), a song composed and written by Marvin Gaye and the theme for the film 
 Trouble Man: Heavy Is the Head, a 2012 album by American rapper T.I.
 "Trouble Man", a song from the 1949 Anderson–Weill musical Lost in the Stars
 Trouble Man, a 2010 album by Robert Aaron